Dirina arabica is a species of saxicolous (rock-dwelling), crustose lichen in the family Roccellaceae. Found in Socotra, it was formally described as a new species in 2013 by lichenologists Anders Tehler and Damien Ernst. The species epithet refers to Arabia, the geographical location encompassing the type locality. The lichen is endemic to Socotra, where it grows on Eocene limestone rocks. It has a creamy-white, slightly  thallus that is 0.1–0.5 mm thick and a chalk-like medulla. There are no soralia on the thallus. Dirina arabica is a sister species to Dirina immersa, a sympatric species that can be distinguished from the former by its  ascomata.

References

arabica
Lichen species
Lichens described in 2013
Lichens of Northeast Tropical Africa